Cotter pin may refer to:

In U.S. usage:
Split pin, a metal fastener with two tines that are bent during installation used to fasten metal together, like with a staple or rivet
Hairpin cotter pin, more commonly known as an "R-clip"
Bowtie cotter pin, a vibration-proof type of R-clip that is shaped like a bowtie
Circle cotter, a ring-shaped cotter pin

In British usage:
Cotter (pin), in mechanical engineering a pin or wedge passing through a hole to fix parts tightly together